Idioses is a monotypic moth genus in the family Cossidae. Its only species, Idioses littleri, was first described by Turner in 1926 and is found in eastern mainland Australia and Tasmania.

References

Natural History Museum Lepidoptera generic names catalog

Moths described in 1926
Cossinae
Monotypic moth genera
Moths of Australia